William Hunt ( 1669 – c. 1733) was the Archdeacon of Bath from 31 December 1711 until his death.

Education
Hunt was educated at John Roysse's Free School in Abingdon (now Abingdon School), and was later scholar and fellow of Pembroke College, Oxford.

Career
He was Canon of Wells and Archdeacon of Bath from 1711 to 1733.

See also
 List of Old Abingdonians

References

Alumni of Pembroke College, Oxford
18th-century English Anglican priests
Archdeacons of Bath
1669 births
1733 deaths
People educated at Abingdon School